Grace Lee (Lee Jin-gyu) (born 13 January 2000) is an American-South Korean ice hockey player. She competed in the 2018 Winter Olympics as a member of the unified Korea women's national ice hockey team. She also plays for the Yale University women’s hockey team.

References

2000 births
Living people
Ice hockey players at the 2018 Winter Olympics
South Korean women's ice hockey forwards
Olympic ice hockey players of South Korea
Winter Olympics competitors for Korea